Taricanus is a genus of longhorn beetles of the subfamily Lamiinae, containing the following species:

 Taricanus truquii Thomson, 1868
 Taricanus zaragozai Noguera & Chemsak, 1993

References

Onciderini